QTSV Quakenbrück, representing its professional team as Artland Dragons, is a basketball club based in Quakenbrück, Germany. Their home arena was the Artland Arena, which has room for 3,000 spectators. From 2003 till 2015 the club played in the Basketball Bundesliga and in several European competitions.

On May 3, 2015, the team announced that it would fold. Ultimately, the management  decided to continue operations in the third tier Bundesliga ProB.

History
Basketball has a long tradition in Quakenbrück. It was first played in the Artland-Gymnasium school. The basketball section of the sports club QTSV Quakenbrück was established in 1955. In the 1970s, the first men's team got their first achievement, by being promoted to the second German League, where they stayed for three seasons.

After a long time without great success, Günter 'Ice' Kollmann, former German basketball player and junior national team member, supported the QTSV team as a main sponsor. By continuous work on the youth education in the 1980s, the team had major successes in the 1990s. In 1994, the team was promoted to the second regional league, followed by promotion to the first regional league one season later, and promotion to the second national league another season later. In 2003, the promotion to the highest national league was made and the name of the club changed officially to Artland Dragons from QTSV Quakenbrück. QTSV then became a smaller partner club in a lower regional league.

In the seasons 1995–96 and 2002–03, the team was unbeaten in its league.

Starting from the 2003–04 season, the Artland Dragons played in the first tier BBL a long time. In the 2006–07 season, the team managed to end 2nd in the regular season and played in the BBL Finals. The team lost 3–1 to first seeded Brose Baskets Bamberg. Starting from the 2007–08 season, the team also played in European competitions for 8 straight years.

In May 2015, the club unexpectedly announced that it would dissolve the professional basketball club. The reasons for the closure included that the Dragons could not keep up with the growing budgets of other BBL teams, due to the club's small arena and lack of big sponsors. Eventually, the team decided to move back to the third division ProB.

Logos

Trophies
German Bundesliga
Runners-up (1): 2007
German Cup
Winners (1): 2008
Runners-up (1): 2007

Season by season

Players

Current roster

Notable players

Partner & youth team
The Partner club of the Artland Dragons is the local basketball club "QTSV", with a men's team playing in the regional league, and a women's team playing in the second German women's league. There are also a variety of other teams (youth and adults, also wheelchair basketball). The youth team of the Artland Dragons is the "Young Dragons", which plays in the NBBL, the German youth team league (Nachwuchs Basketball Bundesliga).

Cheerleader squad and team mascot
The cheerleader squad is called "The Flames". It is trained by Annette Schone. The team mascot is a dragon called, "Tobi der Drache" (Tobi the Dragon).

References

External links
 Artland Dragon's website
 Teamcheck Artland Dragons

Basketball teams in Germany